Campylorhaphion machaeropse is a species of sea snail, a marine gastropod, in the family Eulimidae.

Distribution

This species is distributed in the following locations:

 European waters (ERMS scope)

References

External links
  Serge GOFAS, Ángel A. LUQUE, Joan Daniel OLIVER,José TEMPLADO & Alberto SERRA (2021) - The Mollusca of Galicia Bank (NE Atlantic Ocean); European Journal of Taxonomy 785: 1–114
 World Register of Marine Species

Eulimidae
Gastropods described in 1896